Allium lutescens is a species of plant in the amaryllis family and is native to Kazakhstan, Kyrgyzstan and Uzbekistan.

References 

lutescens
Flora of Kazakhstan
Flora of Kyrgyzstan
Flora of Uzbekistan